Tamás Sándor (born 20 June 1974) is a Hungarian former football player who last played for Báránd KSE and formerly for Debreceni VSC.

Career

Tamás Sándor began his career in his hometown team Debreceni VSC in 1991 and played for the side till 1997 when he joined Italian side Torino Calcio where he failed to impress. He was footballer of the year in 1996 in Hungary. He earned 11 caps for Hungary. He is three-time champion with Debrecen as a captain and all-time top goal scorer of the team. He represented the Hungarian national team at the 1996 Summer Olympics in Atlanta, where Hungary failed to progress from the group stage.

Tamas had a wonderful four-year spell in one of the biggest Israeli clubs, Beitar Jerusalem, the fans loved him and until this very day they remember him as a great footballer and fantastic human being.
In 2009, he retired from professional football, and signed to Hajdu-Bihar Division 1 amateur team, Báránd KSE.

In 2018 Tamás was referenced in the song ״על התמאש ועל העוקץ״ by האחים צברי

Honours

Club
 Debreceni VSC
Hungarian League: 2005, 2006, 2007
Runner-up 2008
Hungarian Cup: 2008
Runners-up 2003, 2007
Hungarian Super Cup: 2005, 2006, 2007
Hungarian League Cup: Runner-up 2008
 Beitar Jerusalem F.C.
Peace Cup: 2000

Individual
 Player of the Year in Hungary: 1997, 2004, 2005, 2006
Zilahi Prize: 2004, 2006

References

1974 births
Living people
Hungarian footballers
Hungary international footballers
Hungary under-21 international footballers
Footballers at the 1996 Summer Olympics
Olympic footballers of Hungary
Hungarian expatriate footballers
Nemzeti Bajnokság I players
Serie B players
Süper Lig players
Debreceni VSC players
Báránd KSE footballers
Torino F.C. players
Gençlerbirliği S.K. footballers
Beitar Jerusalem F.C. players
Expatriate footballers in Italy
Expatriate footballers in Turkey
Expatriate footballers in Israel
Hungarian expatriate sportspeople in Italy
Hungarian expatriate sportspeople in Turkey
Hungarian expatriate sportspeople in Israel

Association football midfielders
Sportspeople from Debrecen